The 1929–30 Swiss National Ice Hockey Championship was the 20th edition of the national ice hockey championship in Switzerland. HC Davos won the championship by defeating Star Lausanne in the final.

First round

Eastern Series 
HC Davos qualified for the final as the only team in the Eastern Series.

Western Series

Final 
 HC Davos - Star Lausanne 16:1

External links 
Swiss Ice Hockey Federation – All-time results

National
Swiss National Ice Hockey Championship seasons